The Dark Spire, known as  in Japan, is a role-playing game developed by Success for the Nintendo DS. It was released on May 22, 2008 in Japan and April 14, 2009 in North America which was published by Atlus.

Gameplay
The gameplay centers on exploring the namesake dungeon known as the Dark Spire while improving the skills and stats of your characters by gaining experience. An alignment system and a class system are included in The Dark Spire.  Your alignment affects who can join your party, what skills can be learned by party members of different classes, and even equipment choices. The Spire is explored in a first-person perspective, and many classical RPG elements are included, such as random encounters and equipment. The player is tasked to find and defeat the Archmage Tyrhung at the top of the Dark Spire and to retrieve a necklace from him.

The Dark Spire is a throwback to old first-person dungeon crawler RPGs, such as The Bard's Tale or Wizardry. As a tribute, the game can be set in a mode which renders graphics and sound/music which could have been produced in a game dating to the late 1980s or early 1990s. The game allows you to play as one of four races - human, dwarf, elf or halfling - each with unique stats and standard alignment.

Development

Reception

The game received "average" reviews according to video game review aggregator Metacritic.

Notes

References

External links
 
 
 Japanese website

Atlus games
2008 video games
Nintendo DS games
Nintendo DS-only games
Fantasy video games
Retro-style video games
Role-playing video games
Success (company) games
Video games developed in Japan